The North Korean XII Corps(제 12군단) is a formation of the Korean People's Army Ground Force established in 2010.

The XII Corps is a reserve infantry corps, deployed near the Korean-Chinese border, including the Ryanggang Province. Its tasks include managing the local territorial forces, homeland defence and internal security.

In January 2019, sources in Ryanggang province reported that the soldiers of XII Corps are notorious for being malnourished and undisciplined. They have been known to resort to begging and theft to sustain themselves, particularly during the winter. Desertion rates within the corps are also reportedly particularly high.

See also

I Corps
II Corps
III Corps
IV Corps
V Corps

References 

Corps of North Korea
Military units and formations established in 2010